Karasor is a salt lake in May District, Pavlodar Region, Kazakhstan.

Karasor is one of the largest lakes in the district.

Geography
Karasor is an endorheic lake of the Kazakh Uplands. The Irtysh flows  to the east of the eastern shores of the lake. There are a number of smaller lakes in its vicinity, the largest is Aktomar,  to the northwest.

River Tundik flows into Karasor from the west. The shape of the lake is irregular, very indented, with a southern and a western projection. Although it rarely dries up, in years of drought the level of Karasor sinks, and its southern projection may become a separate lake, also known as Zhinishkesor (Жіңішкесор).

See also
List of lakes of Kazakhstan

References

External links

Tectonic sketch map of the Kazakhstan Paleozoides
Lower and Upper Cambrian Bradoriida, Ostracoda, of northeastern Central Kazakhstan

Lakes of Kazakhstan
Pavlodar Region
Endorheic basins of Asia